The 1984 African Cup of Champions Clubs was the 20th edition of the annual international club football competition held in the CAF region (Africa), the African Cup of Champions Clubs. It determined that year's club champion of association football in Africa.

The tournament was played by 39 teams and was used a playoff scheme with home and away matches. Zamalek SC from Egypt won that final, and became for the first time CAF club champion.

Preliminary round

|}
1

First round

|}
1 
2

Second round

|}
1 
2 
3

Quarter-finals

|}
1

Semi-finals

|}

Final

Champion

Top scorers

The top scorers from the 1984 African Cup of Champions Clubs are as follows:

References
RSSSF.com

1984 in African football
African Cup of Champions Clubs